The Brit Award for British Dance Act is an award given by the British Phonographic Industry (BPI), an organisation which represents record companies and artists in the United Kingdom. The accolade was presented at the Brit Awards, an annual celebration of British and international music. The winners and nominees were determined by the Brit Awards voting academy with over one-thousand members comprising record labels, publishers, managers, agents, media, and previous winners and nominees.

The inaugural recipients of the award are M People, who won consecutively in 1994 and 1995. Fatboy Slim was the first solo act to win the category in 2000 and is one of four acts to have won the award twice, alongside M People, The Prodigy, Basement Jaxx and Becky Hill. Jamiroquai hold the record for most nominations without a win, with six. The current holder of the award is Hill, who won in 2023.

History
The award was first presented in 1994. British Dance Act has been won by M People, The Prodigy, Fatboy Slim, Basement Jaxx and Becky Hill  the most times, with two wins each.

In 2021, it was announced that the category had been revived followng the removal of gendered awards and was first presented at the 42nd Brit Awards. This new iteration is voted for by the public on TikTok alongside the three other genre categories (Pop/R&B Act, Rock/Alternative Act and Hip Hop/Grime/Rap Act)

Winners and nominees

Original category (1994-2004)

Revived category (2022-present)

Multiple nominations and awards

References

Brit Awards
Dance music awards
Awards established in 1994